Joan of Arc is a 1935 German historical drama film directed by Gustav Ucicky and starring Angela Salloker, Gustaf Gründgens and Heinrich George. It depicts the life of Joan of Arc, and is the first female embodiment of the Nazi Führer figure in film. The press in Germany and abroad detected direct parallels between the presentation of France in 1429 and the situation in Germany in 1935.

It was shot at the Babelsberg Studios in Berlin. The film's sets were designed by the art directors Robert Herlth and Walter Röhrig.

Cast

Reception
Writing for The Spectator in 1935, British writer Graham Greene criticized the film for historical inaccuracies (like Joan's rescue of Charles VII at Orléans rather than meeting at Chinon), as well as for what he called its "Nazi psychology" (including the "heavily underlined" political parallels between the June 30 purge and that of Trémoille, and between the Reichstag fire and the execution of Joan in Rouen). Greene described the overall effect to be dull and noisy, and described the direction as "terribly sincere, conveying a kind of blond and shaven admiration for poor lonely dictators who have been forced to eliminate their allies."

References

External links

1930s historical drama films
German historical drama films
Films of Nazi Germany
Films directed by Gustav Ucicky
Films about Joan of Arc
UFA GmbH films
Films shot at Babelsberg Studios
German black-and-white films
1935 drama films
1930s German films
1930s German-language films